"Taro no To" (Japanese title TAROの塔) is a 2011 dorama created by NHK. Directed by NHK employees Yoshihiko Nagikawa and Mitsuhiro Fukui, it stars Suzuki Matsuo as Okamoto Taro during his rise to fame and the construction of the Tower of the Sun in Osaka.

Overview 

The drama aired on Saturdays beginning at 9:00 on February 26, 2011, a special 4-episode series to commemorate 100 years since the establishment of NHK. The broadcast was disrupted and schedule changed due to the Tohoku earthquake on March 11th that year.

Cast 

 Okamoto Taro - Matsuo Suzuki
 Okamoto Toshiko  - Takako Tokiwa - Taro's wife
 Okamoto Ippei - Tanabe Seiichi - Taro's father, a famous writer and manga artist
 Okamtoto Kanako - Terashima Shinobu - Taro's mother, a writer
 Okazaki Kozo - Nishida Toshiyuki
 Tange Kenzo - Kohinata Fumiyo - famous architect
 Togo Seiji - Nakao Akira

Staff 

 Script - Ohmori Sumio
 Producers - Kitamura Nobuhiko
 Directors - Yoshihiko Nagikawa and Mitsuhiro Fukui
 Camera - Soma Kazunori
 Soundtrack - Haishima Kuniaki
 Kappore director - Sakuragawa Pinsuke

External links 

 NHK link (Japanese)
 NHK Archives (Japanese)
Japanese television specials
Japanese period television series
NHK television dramas